BFC may refer to:

 Bourgogne-Franche-Comté, a region of France
 Bromofluorocarbon, a haloalkane fully substituted by bromine and fluorine
 Engineering slang for a supercapacitor
 Engineering slang for a very large capacitor

In football (soccer)

 Barnet F.C., a football team in England
 Barnsley F.C., a football team in England
 Beachside FC, a football team in Tasmania, Australia
 Bearsted F.C., a football team in England
 Belgrave Football Club, a football team in Victoria, Australia
 Bengaluru FC, a football team in Bengaluru, India
 Berkhamsted F.C., a football team in England
 Berliner FC Dynamo, a football team in Germany
 Blackpool F.C., a football team in England
 Boavista F.C., a football (soccer) club in Portugal
 Bologna FC, a football team in Italy
 Brazilian Football Confederation, national governing body for football (soccer) in Brazil
 Brentford F.C., a football team in England
 Bromley F.C., a football team in England
 Burnley F.C., a football team in England
 Bury F.C., a football team in England
 Buxton F.C., a football team in England

In the military

 Battle Force Capability, a surface combatant mission 
 British Forces Cyprus, the British Armed Forces stationed in the UK sovereign base areas on the island of Cyprus
 British Free Corps, a unit comprising renegade Britons in the army of Nazi Germany
 the French acronym for a Canadian Forces base

As an organization 

 Banco Fondo Común, a bank in Venezuela
 Beiqi Foton Motor, a Chinese automobile manufacturer
 Bellator Fighting Championships, a mixed martial arts organization
 Bible Fellowship Church, a conservative pietistic Christian denomination with Mennonite roots
 Bikers for Christ
 Blackpool and The Fylde College
 Betty Ford Center, addiction recovery facility

Other uses
 Base One Foundation Component Library, a rapid application development toolkit
 Bellefonte Central Railroad
 Beekse Fusie Club, Dutch handball club
 Black Family Channel, a TV channel
 Brighton Festival Chorus
 British Film Commission
 Business financial consultant
 Business and Financial Centre, former working name for the Marina Bay Financial Centre in Singapore
 The Bund Finance Center, a building in The Bund, Shanghai, China

See also

 BFCS